Harold "Shorty" Baker (May 26, 1914 in St. Louis, Missouri, US – November 8, 1966) was an American jazz trumpeter.

Baker began on drums, but switched to trumpet during his teens. He started his career on riverboats and played with Don Redman in the mid-1930s. He also worked with Teddy Wilson and Andy Kirk before joining Duke Ellington. He married Kirk's pianist Mary Lou Williams and though the two separated shortly thereafter, they never officially divorced.

Baker worked on and off in Duke Ellington's Orchestra from 1942 to 1962. He also worked with Johnny Hodges's group in the early 1950s, during the period when Hodges was not a member of Ellington's orchestra.

He died of throat cancer in New York at the age of 52.

Discography

As leader/co-leader
The Broadway Beat (King, 1959)
The Bud Freeman All-Stars featuring Shorty Baker (Swingville, 1960) with Bud Freeman
Shorty & Doc (Swingville, 1961) with Doc Cheatham

As sideman

With Johnny Hodges
The Blues (Norgran, 1952–54, [1955])
Used to Be Duke (Norgran, 1954)
The Big Sound (Verve, 1957)

With Billy Strayhorn
Cue for Saxophone (Felsted, 1959)

References

External links 

Jazz trumpet site

1914 births
1966 deaths
American jazz trumpeters
American male trumpeters
Duke Ellington Orchestra members
Musicians from St. Louis
Swing trumpeters
20th-century American musicians
Jazz musicians from Missouri
American male jazz musicians
20th-century American male musicians